The Fairey P.24 Monarch was a British experimental 2,000 hp (1,490 kW) class H-24 aircraft engine designed and built by Fairey in the late 1930s. The engine did not go into production.

Design and development
The P.24 Monarch was a 24-cylinder development of the H-16 layout version of the Prince, designed by chief engine designer Captain A.G. Forsyth. Similar in layout to the Napier Dagger, the cylinders were arranged vertically in two blocks, driving contra-rotating propellers using separate shafts and gears. Like the smaller Prince engine, one bank of cylinders could be stopped in flight with the other still driving its own propeller, an idea that was reused much later in the Armstrong Siddeley Double Mamba turboprop.

The idea came from the desire to deliver twin-engine power with twin-engine reliability in a single engine installation for naval use. A twin-engined aircraft would take up more space on an aircraft carrier. With two power blocks a failure in one of them would not necessarily lead to complete loss of engine power.

The engine was test flown in a Fairey Battle, serial K9370, with its first flight taking place on 30 June 1939.

The engine was considered for use in the Hawker Tornado and K9370 was later shipped to Wright Field in the US, where testing (Project MX-229) was carried out in 1942 with a view to using the potentially 3,000 hp of the P.24 in the Republic P-47 Thunderbolt, a total of around 250 hours of test flying in the Battle being completed at Wright Field before the idea was abandoned. Following cancellation, the engine provided three trouble-free years of service in K9370.

Applications
 Fairey Battle

Projected applications
 Hawker Tornado
 P-47 Thunderbolt

Specifications (P.24 Monarch)

See also

References

Notes

Bibliography

 Gunston, Bill. World Encyclopedia of Aero Engines. Cambridge, England. Patrick Stephens Limited, 1989. 
 Lumsden, Alec. British Piston Engines and their Aircraft. Marlborough, Wiltshire: Airlife Publishing, 2003. .

External links

 Report on the P-24 by Experimental Engineering Section of the Power Plant Laboratory at Wright Field USA 
 US report on engineering considerations 
 US report on dual propeller 

Monarch
1930s aircraft piston engines
H engines